Cathal Ó Searcaigh (born 12 July 1956), is a modern Irish language poet. His work has been widely translated, anthologised and studied. "His confident internationalism", according to Theo Dorgan, has channeled "new modes, new possibilities, into the writing of Irish language poetry in our time".

Since 1975, he has produced poetry, plays, and travelogues. His early poetry deals with place, tongue and tradition, with his late work showing a broader scope. His work includes homoerotic love poems. Jody Allen Randolph remarks "his breaking down of stereotypes and new deployment of gendered themes opened a new space in which to consider alternate sexualities within a contemporary Irish context."

The critic John McDonagh argues that "Ó Searcaigh occupies many of the spaces that stand in opposition to the traditionally dominant markers of Irish identity". In his anthology, McDonagh goes on to say "Ó Searcaigh's homoerotic poems are explicit, relishing in a sensuality that for many years rarely found explicit expression in Irish literature."

Early life
Cathal Ó Searcaigh was born and reared on a small hill-farm at the foot of An tEaragal (Mount Errigal) in the Donegal Gaeltacht. He was educated locally at Caiseal na gCorr National School and then at Gairmscoil Ghort a' Choirce. He describes his childhood in a remote Irish-speaking community in his memoir Light on Distant Hills.

The first poems that engaged his attention were those of Robert Burns, read to him by his father. Tom Walsh, his English teacher at the Gairmscoil in Gortahork, encouraged him to write.

Personal life
In the early 1970s, he worked as a barman in London. Later he attended the NIHE (National Institute for Higher Education) in Limerick where he did European Studies for two years (1973–75) and followed that with one year at Maynooth University (1977–78) where he did Celtic Studies.

From 1978 to 1981, he worked in Dublin with RTÉ television presenting Aisling Gheal, an arts and music programme directed by musician Tony MacMahon. From the early 1980s, he has earned his living as a full-time writer and poet.

In the spring of 1995, he was elected a member of Aosdána.

His work has been translated into numerous languages – French, German, Italian, Breton, Catalan, Polish, Danish, Serbo-Croat, Romanian, Slovene, Russian, Swedish, Japanese, and Nepali.

Controversy

Ó Searcaigh began to visit Nepal and sponsor the education and needs of youngsters in Nepal in 1996. The Garda Síochána (Irish police force) started to investigate Ó Searcaigh in 2006, though nothing ever came of this.

In February 2007, a film documentary (Fairytale of Kathmandu, by Neasa Ní Chianáin) queried Ó Searcaigh's relationships with some of the teens he helped, focusing on power imbalance and financial accountability, causing some controversy. In February 2009, Ó Searcaigh was interviewed in English by Dermod Moore on the controversy for Hot Press.

Other literary activities

Ó Searcaigh has donated his archives, an extensive library of books and a valuable art collection to the Irish State.  The Donegal Library Service administers this donation at present. His house in Mín a' Leá at the foot of Mount Errigal is often the venue for literary and musical evenings hosted by the poet himself.

He edits Irish Pages, a literary journal, along with poet and literary critic Chris Agee.

"Creativity for me arises out of my deep attachment to this place, out of a reverential affection for its people", he says in his memoir Light on Distant Hills. "My poems are devotional in the sense that they are prayerful celebrations of place, tongue and tradition. My work has become known because of its connectedness with this place. I have become a collector of its oral traditions, an archivist of its memories and its myths, a guardian of its Gaelic. This is, I suppose, a political act, acknowledging the local, recording and registering what is past or passing."

Colm Tóibín wrote in the Times Literary Supplement: "There is a section of landscape in Donegal in the north of Ireland near Falcarragh, overlooking Tory Island, which has been utterly transformed by the poetry of Cathal Ó Searcaigh."

Awards and honours
 1996: Elected to Aosdána
 2000: Awarded an Honorary Doctorate in Celtic Studies from the National University of Ireland
 2000: Awarded the Irish Times Literature Prize for Ag Tnúth Leis an tSolas, poems 1975-2000
 2007: The Ireland Fund Literary Award for his significant contribution to Irish literature.
 2013: He has won many Oireachtas literary awards since the beginning of his literary career, the most recent being the primary prize for a poetry collection with Aimsir Ársa in 2013 and again with An Bhé Ghlas in 2015
 His poems have been on the Leaving Certificate Irish language curriculum for many years. His work is studied extensively at university level in Ireland and abroad

Selected publications

Poetry
 1975: Miontraigéide Chathrach agus Dánta Eile, Cló Uí Chuirreáin
 1978: Tuirlingt (with Gabriel Rosenstock and photographer Bill Doyle) Carbad, Dublin
 1983: Súile Shuibhne: with photographs by Rachael Giese, (a Poetry Ireland choice for 1983) Coiscéim, Dublin
 1987: Suibhne, (nominated for the Irish Book Awards) Coiscéim
 1991: An Bealach 'na Bhaile, Cló Iar-Chonnacht, Indreabhán, Co Galway
 1996: Na Buachaillí Bána, Cló Iar-Chonnacht, Indreabhán
 1999: Fiacha an tSolais
 2000: Ag Tnúth leis an tSolas, 1975-2000, Cló Iar-Chonnacht, Indreabhán
 2002: Caiseal na gCorr (with photographs by Jan Voster) Cló Iar-Chonnacht, Indreabhán
2004: Winter Lights, (collaborative haiku booklet with Nepalese Haiku Poet Janak Sapkota), Cló Ceardlann na gCnoc, Co Donegal
 2005: Na hAingle ó Xanadú, Arlen House, Galway
 2006: Gúrú i gClúidíní (artwork by Ian Joyce) Cló Iar-Chonnacht, Indreabhán
 2011: An tAm Marfach ina Mairimid (artwork by Ian Joyce) Arlen House, Galway
 2013: Aimsir Ársa (artwork by Ian Joyce) Arlen House, Galway
 2014: Na Saighneáin (artwork by Ian Joyce) Arlen House, Galway
 2015: An Bhé Ghlas, Leabhar Breac, Indreabhán
 2018: Teanga na gCorr, Arlen House, Dublin
 2020: Laoithe Cumainn agus Dánta Eile, Arlen House, Dublin
 2021: Miontragóid Chathrach agus Dánta Eile (Leagan leasaithe / An improved version of the poet's first collection of poems published in 1975)
 2022: An Tír Rúin, Arlen House, Dublin

Bilingual poetry editions
 1993: Homecoming / An Bealach 'na Bhaile (edited by Gabriel Fitzmaurice), Cló Iar-Chonnacht : winner of the Seán Ó Riordáin Prize for Poetry 1993, this book has been a bestseller and has gone into many editions		 
 1997: Out in the Open: edited and translated by Frank Sewell, Cló Iar-Chonnacht, Indreabhán : this collection was nominated for the Aristeon European Prize for Poetry 1998
 2006: By the Hearth in Mín a' Leá: translations by Seamus Heaney and Frank Sewell, Arc Publications : The Poetry Society (UK) Translation Choice for 2006
 2015: An Fear Glas / The Green man, with artwork by Pauline Bewick (translations by Paddy Pushe, Gabriel Rosenstock and Frank Sewell) Arlen House, Galway
 2016: Out of the Wilderness (translations by Gabriel Rosenstock) The Onslaught Press, Oxford
 2018: Crann na Teanga, a large volume of poems selected from 17 previously published collections, presented in Irish with parallel English translations by Paddy Bush and by the poet himself. The Irish Pages Press, with the support of the Arts Council of Ireland/An Chomhairle Ealaíon

Prose works in Irish
 2004: Seal i Neipeal (travel writing), Cló Iar-Chonnacht, Indreabhán : winner of the Piaras Béaslaí Prize for Prose in the Oireachtas 2004
 2011: Pianó Mhín na bPreachán (novella) Cló Iar-Chonnacht, Indreabhán
 2017: Lugh na Bua / The Deliverer: Cathal ó Searcaigh, Seán Ó Gaoithín, Seán Fitzgerald: The Onslaught Press, Oxford
 2018: Teach an Gheafta (novel) Leabhar Breac, Indreabhán

Plays
 2005: Oíche Dhrochghealaí: a verse drama based on the story of Salome, Coiscéim, Dublin
 2006: Mairimid Leis na Mistéirí: three short plays, Arlen House, Galway
 2019: Rockabilly Balor: ceoldráma, Onslaught Press

Writing in English
 2009: Light on Distant Hills, a Memoir, Simon & Schuster, London
 2014: Soul Space: a book of spiritual wisdom (written under the pseudonym Charles Agnes) Evertype, Westport
 2018: The View from the Glen: Selected Prose in English, The Onslaught Press, Oxford

History
 1994: Tulach Beaglaoich: Inné agus Inniu / Tulach Begley: Past and Present, Glór na nGael, Fál Carragh

As editor
 1997: An Chéad Chló: a selection of the work of new Irish language poets, Cló Iar-Chonnacht, Indreabhán
 2013: The Other Tongues: an Introduction to Writing in Irish, Scots Gaelic and Scots in Ulster and Scotland, Irish Pages, Belfast
 2013: Margadh na Míol i Valparaiso / The Flea Market in Valparaiso: Selected Poems of Gabriel Rosenstock (selected and introduced by Cathal Ó Searcaigh), Cló Iar-Chonnacht, Indreabhán
 2014: An tAmharc Deireannach / The Last Look: the Selected Poems of Colette Ní Ghallchóir  (selected and introduced by Cathal Ó Searcaigh), Arlen House, Galway

Collaborations: Music
 2005: Tearmann (A sequence of Ó Searcaigh poems put to music by Neil Martin and performed by the poet himself with the West Ocean String Quartet), live performance, Cliften Arts Festival 
 2009: Oileán na Marbh (Song cycle with composer Neil Martin, sung by Maighread Ní Dhomhnaill and accompanied by the West Ocean Quartet) Ae Fond Kiss, West Ocean Records
 2012: Síle an tSléibhe (opera monodrama with composer Derek Ball, sung by Elizabeth Hilliard with chamber group and electroacoustic sound) live performances at the Back Loft (La Catedral theatre) Dublin in Sept 2012, and the Contemporary Music Centre, Dublin in Jan 2013
 2013: Rhapsody na gCrann (words by Cathal Ó Searcaigh, music by Ciarán and Pól Brennan, sung by Clannad) Clannad Nádúr Arc Music

Cathal has also collaborated with Altan, Brian Kennedy, Diana Cannon and many other well-known musicians.

Collaborations: Art
 2003: Trasnú, a collaboration with artist Maria Simonds Gooding which included an exhibition, public forum and book (published by An Gailearaí, Gaoth Dobhair)
 2004: Luxury of a Skylight, collaboration with artist Janet Mullarney: a limited boxed edition, numbered and signed, with poems and drawings.  Published by Edizioni Canopo, Prato, Italy
 2005: Dialann / Diary, a collaboration with artist Barbara Lea and book-maker Paulette Myres-Rich, a limited boxed edition, numbered and signed. Published by Traffic Street Press, St Paul, Minnesota
 2012: The Green Man, A portfolio of 10 lithographs created and printed by Aoife McGarrigle at Cló Ceardlann na gCnoc, Co Donegal, with 10 poems by Cathal Ó Searcaigh: a limited boxed edition, numbered and signed
 2004: The View from Bealtaine, based on Cór Úr, a much anthologised poem by Ó Searcaigh, designed and printed by Barbara Tetenbaum at Cló Ceardlann na gCnoc, Co Donegal. Limited edition, numbered and signed

Books about his poetry
 2000: Modern Irish Poetry: A New Alhambra, Frank Sewell, Oxford University Press
 2002: On the side of Light: Critical essays on the poetry of Cathal Ó Searcaigh, edited by James Doan & Frank Sewell, Arlen House, Galway
 2005: Na Buachaillí Dána: Cathal Ó Searcaigh, Gabriel Rosenstock by Pádraig de Paor, An Clóchomhar, Dublin

References

1956 births
20th-century Irish poets
21st-century Irish poets
21st-century Irish-language poets
21st-century Irish dramatists and playwrights
21st-century Irish novelists
Living people
Aosdána members
Irish LGBT poets
Irish LGBT novelists
Irish LGBT dramatists and playwrights
Irish male poets
Irish male dramatists and playwrights
20th-century travel writers
Irish travel writers
Irish gay writers
People from County Donegal
Gay poets
Gay novelists
Gay dramatists and playwrights
20th-century Irish male writers
21st-century Irish male writers
Irish-language writers
21st-century LGBT people